The third legislative assembly of Madras state (3 March 1962 – 28 February 1967) was constituted in March 1962 after the assembly election which was held in February  1962.

Overview 
The general elections were held in 1962 for 206 constituencies. In the election, Congress under the leadership of Kamaraj won with a majority, and subsequently formed the government. Kamaraj proposed the Kamaraj Plan and on 2 October 1963 he resigned from the Chief Minister post. After the resignation, M. Bakthavatsalam became the chief minister of Tamil Nadu. In 1965, the strength of the assembly was increased to 234 by the Delimitation of Parliamentary and Assembly Constituencies Order, 1965.

Kamaraj's cabinet 
The council of ministers in the Kamaraj cabinet:

Bhaktavatsalam's cabinet 
The council of ministers in the Bhaktavatsalam cabinet:

See also 
1962 Madras State legislative assembly election
Tamil Nadu Legislative Assembly

References 

Tamil Nadu Legislative Assembly